Daniel 'Dani' García Carrillo (born 24 May 1990) is a Spanish footballer who plays as a midfielder for Athletic Bilbao.

He spent the vast majority of his professional career with Eibar since joining in 2012 (initially on loan), representing the club in all three major levels of Spanish football and playing 224 competitive matches. In 2018, he signed with Athletic Bilbao.

Club career

Early career
Born in Zumarraga, Gipuzkoa, Basque Country, García started his career in the cantera of Real Sociedad, and made his senior debut with Alicante CF B in 2009–10. He was promoted to the latter's first team later that year, but suffered relegation from Segunda División B in his second season.

On 24 June 2011, García joined fellow league club Getafe CF B.

Eibar
García signed with Real Sociedad in July 2012, being immediately loaned back to the third tier to play for SD Eibar. He finished his debut campaign with 41 league appearances to his credit, helping the side to promote in the playoffs.

In July 2013, García's loan to Eibar was renewed, and he made his Segunda División debut on 18 August, starting in a 2–1 away win against Real Jaén. On 26 June 2014 he signed permanently with the Armeros, promoted to La Liga for the first time ever.

García made his debut in the Spanish top flight on 24 August 2014, starting in a 1–0 home victory over former employers Real Sociedad. He scored his first goal in the competition on 19 September, opening the 2–0 away defeat of Elche CF.

On 17 November 2015, García renewed his contract with Eibar until 2018. In April 2017, having only missed nine league games since their promotion, he became the first player to reach the milestone of 100 top-division appearances for the club; in October of the same year, he became only their twelfth player to play in 200 matches.

Athletic Bilbao
On 3 June 2018, Athletic Bilbao announced that García had signed a four-year contract after the transfer was agreed in March.

Career statistics

Club

Honours
Eibar
Segunda División: 2013–14

Athletic Bilbao
Supercopa de España: 2020–21
Copa del Rey runner-up: 2019–20, 2020–21

References

External links

1990 births
Living people
Sportspeople from Gipuzkoa
Spanish footballers
Footballers from the Basque Country (autonomous community)
Association football midfielders
La Liga players
Segunda División players
Segunda División B players
Tercera División players
Alicante CF footballers
Getafe CF B players
Real Sociedad footballers
SD Eibar footballers
Athletic Bilbao footballers
Basque Country international footballers